Marillet is a commune in the Vendée department in the Pays de la Loire region in western France.

Marillet is the smallest commune in Vendée and is associated with the Puy-de-Serre and Faymoreau coal mines.

See also
Communes of the Vendée department

References

Communes of Vendée